The 2017 ACC Emerging Teams Asia Cup was the second edition of the ACC Emerging Teams Asia Cup held in Bangladesh. Eight teams participated in the tournament including four under-23 age level teams of Test nations and four top associate teams from Asia.This Competition was organized by ACC (Asian Cricket Council).

Teams

Squads

Group stage

Group A

Group B

Knockout stage

Semi-final 1

Semi-final 2

Final

See also
 2013 ACC Emerging Teams Cup

References

External links
Series at home ESPN Cricinfo
Asian Cricket Council competitions